Grignon or Grignion may refer to:

Places
 Rivière à Grignon, a tributary of lac Saint-Jean in Chambor, Quebec, Canada
 Grignon, Côte-d'Or, commune in Côte-d'Or department, France
 Grignon, Savoie, commune in Savoie department, France
 Grignon, a hamlet constituting, with the village of Thiverval, the commune of Thiverval-Grignon, in the department of Yvelines

Other uses
 Institut National Agronomique Paris-Grignon, a French grande école, part of AgroParisTech

Person with the surname
 Charles Grignion (disambiguation)
 Claude-Henri Grignon (1894–1976), writer, journalist, speaker and pamphleteer from Quebec
 Marcel Grignon (1914–1990), French cameraman
 Francis Grignon (born 1944), French politician

French-language surnames